Oedoparena is a small genus of flies from the family Dryomyzidae. They are the only known dipterous predator of marine barnacles. There are only three known species.

Species
O. glauca (Coquillett, 1900) 
O. minor Suwa, 1981
O. nigrifrons Mathis and Steyskal, 1980

References

Dryomyzidae
Sciomyzoidea genera